Eastgate House may refer to:

Eastgate House, Rochester, a Grade I listed house in Rochester, Kent
Eastgate House, Cardiff, a high-rise office building in Cardiff